The Barnstormers Theatre is located in Tamworth, New Hampshire, and is the oldest ongoing professional summer theatre in the United States.  It was founded in 1931 by Francis Cleveland, the son of 22nd president Grover Cleveland.  It is one of the only professional theatres in the United States that performs eight shows in eight consecutive weeks every summer.

History 
In 1931 Francis and Alice Cleveland founded the theatre company, along with their friend, Ed Goodnow.  During the summer they would lead a company of resident actors around the region, performing different plays each night.  In some cases they would literally storm barns, arriving in the afternoon to set up their scenery and lights in time for an evening performance.

After World War II the acting company purchased Kimball's Store on Main Street, across from the Tamworth Inn, and transformed the building into a theatre.  Since then the theatre's acting company has kept the rigorous schedule of rehearsing one play by day, and performing another by night, from the end of June to the beginning of September.  Francis Cleveland acted as Artistic Director until his death in 1995.

The theatre 
  
In 1998 The Barnstormers Theatre was renovated and winterized.  It now seats 282 patrons, is heated and air conditioned, and hosts touring performances as well as producing summer theatre.  Many of The Barnstormers' performances are classic comedies, murder mysteries, and musicals from the British and American stage.  In 2006 the Barnstormers celebrated its 75th anniversary.

See also
New Hampshire Historical Marker No. 90: First Summer Playhouse

References

External links 
The Barnstormers Theatre website

Buildings and structures in Carroll County, New Hampshire
Theatres in New Hampshire
Arts organizations established in 1931
Tourist attractions in Carroll County, New Hampshire
Tamworth, New Hampshire